A Lucky Sweep is a 1932 British comedy film directed by A. V. Bramble and starring John Longden, Diana Beaumont and A. G. Poulton. It was made at Elstree Studios as a quota quickie.

Cast
 John Longden as Bill Higgins  
 Diana Beaumont as Polly  
 A. G. Poulton as Joshua  
 Marie Wright as Martha  
 Sybil Jane as Miss Grey  
 Elsie Prince as Secretary 
 Elsie Moore

References

Bibliography
 Chibnall, Steve. Quota Quickies: The Birth of the British 'B' Film. British Film Institute, 2007.
 Low, Rachael. Filmmaking in 1930s Britain. George Allen & Unwin, 1985.
 Wood, Linda. British Films, 1927-1939. British Film Institute, 1986.

External links

1932 films
British comedy films
1932 comedy films
Films directed by A. V. Bramble
Quota quickies
Films shot at Rock Studios
British black-and-white films
1930s English-language films
1930s British films